Beasha Creek is a stream in the U.S. state of Mississippi. It is a tributary to the Pearl River.

Beasha Creek is a name derived from the Choctaw language meaning roughly "mulberries are there". Old variant names are "Beashers Creek" and "Beheaiaha Creek".

References

Rivers of Mississippi
Rivers of Neshoba County, Mississippi
Tributaries of the Pearl River (Mississippi–Louisiana)
Mississippi placenames of Native American origin